Reeltime may refer to:

 Reeltime.tv, Australian broadband television operator 
 Reeltime Pictures, British multimedia film and video production company
 ReelTime, a QuickTime-based video editing software developed by SuperMac Technology
Reeltime (album)